Volavola is a surname. Notable people with the surname include:

Ben Volavola (born 1991), Australian-born Fijian rugby union player
Mosese Volavola (born 1979), Fijian rugby union player
Peni Volavola, Fijian politician
Timoci Volavola, Fijian rugby union player

Fijian-language surnames